Tertiary Highway 801, now known as Road 801 or Auden Road, was a provincially maintained highway in the Canadian province of Ontario. The  tertiary highway was located entirely in Greenstone, in south central Thunder Bay District. It was established in 1963 as a forest resource access road to the Sturgeon River Mine. In 2010, jurisdiction over the highway was transferred to the Ministry of Natural Resources.

Route description  
Highway801 began at Highway 11, part of the Trans-Canada Highway, at Nezah, between the towns of Jellicoe to the east and Beardmore to the west.
From there, the locally maintained Auden Road continued north to the Auden flag stop serviced by VIA Rails Canadian line.
Highway801 was located within the former townships of Walter and Elmhirst.
There are no communities along the former highway, with Jellicoe being the closest settlement,  to the east.
In 2008, the final year for which traffic data is available, an average of 90vehicles travelled along the highway each day.

History 
Highway801 was first assumed as a provincial highway on October24, 1963, as a forest resource access road to connect Highway11 with the Sturgeon River Mine.
The route remained unchanged throughout its existence. On September1, 2010, jurisdiction over the highway was transferred to the Ministry of Natural Resources. Today the roadway is signed as Road801.

Major intersections

References

External links 

 Highway 801 - Length and Route

0801
Roads in Thunder Bay District